Mario Sean Clark (born March 29, 1954) is an American football cornerback who played for the Buffalo Bills and San Francisco 49ers of the National Football League (NFL).  He played college football at the University of Oregon.

Playing for the Bills, Clark had 25 NFL interceptions by the age of 27. He managed only one more interception the rest of his career, finishing his NFL career with 26 interceptions. He won a Super Bowl championship in 1984 as a member of the 49ers in Super Bowl XIX.

References 

1954 births
Living people
Players of American football from Pasadena, California
Pasadena High School (California) alumni
American football cornerbacks
Buffalo Bills players
San Francisco 49ers players
Oregon Ducks football players